Saqib Qureshi (18 January 1947 – 28 March 1998) was a Pakistani cricket umpire. He stood in one ODI game in 1994.

See also
 List of One Day International cricket umpires

References

1947 births
1998 deaths
Pakistani One Day International cricket umpires
People from Karachi